Benavides is a city in Duval County, Texas, United States. The population was 1,362 at the 2010 census, down from 1,686 at the 2000 census.

History
The town is named after Plácido Benavides (1837–1919), namesake nephew of Plácido Benavides (1810–1837), Tejano 1832 alcalde of Victoria, who served under Stephen F. Austin with Juan Seguin, in the Siege of Béxar.

Plácido Benavides whom the town is named after served in the Confederate States Army. After the war, he built his "Rancho Palo Alto" into one of the largest ranches in Duval County. In 1880, he agreed to let the county locate a railroad station on his property. In 1881, he donated  to establish the community that grew up around the station on the Texas Mexican Railway.

In 1882 Archie Parr arrived to manage the Sweden Ranch for the Lott & Nielson Pasture Company. The former schoolteacher and ranch hand was later a rancher, Texas state senator, and the first "Duke of Duval", political boss of the county. His middle son, George Berham Parr, succeeded him as El Patrón and Duke of Duval. Other descendants of Archie also figured prominently in county politics. In 1911, Archie campaigned unsuccessfully to move the county courthouse from San Diego to Benavides.

Geography

Benavides is located southeast of the center of Duval County at  (27.596677, –98.411884), in the valley of Santa Gertrudis Creek. Texas State Highway 359 runs through the city, leading northeast  to San Diego, the county seat, and southwest  to Hebbronville. Texas State Highway 339 also passes through Benavides, leading northwest  to Freer, and south  to its end at TX 285.

Demographics

2020 census

As of the 2020 United States census, there were 1,183 people, 622 households, and 460 families residing in the city.

2000 census
As of the census of 2000, there were 1,686 people, 625 households, and 444 families residing in the city. The population density was 934.0 people per square mile (359.7/km2). There were 776 housing units at an average density of 429.9 per square mile (165.5/km2). The racial makeup of the city was 83.57% White, 0.06% African American, 0.30% Native American, 0.06% Asian, 13.82% from other races, and 2.19% from two or more races. Hispanic or Latino of any race were 95.55% of the population.

There were 625 households, out of which 30.7% had children under the age of 18 living with them, 50.2% were married couples living together, 16.8% had a female householder with no husband present, and 28.8% were non-families. 26.7% of all households were made up of individuals, and 15.8% had someone living alone who was 65 years of age or older. The average household size was 2.70 and the average family size was 3.28.

In the city, the population was spread out, with 26.1% under the age of 18, 8.7% from 18 to 24, 26.0% from 25 to 44, 20.5% from 45 to 64, and 18.7% who were 65 years of age or older. The median age was 38 years. For every 100 females, there were 92.7 males. For every 100 females age 18 and over, there were 88.8 males.

The median income for a household in the city was $21,513, and the median income for a family was $27,059. Males had a median income of $26,250 versus $15,481 for females. The per capita income for the city was $11,332. About 25.1% of families and 28.7% of the population were below the poverty line, including 31.2% of those under age 18 and 32.5% of those age 65 or over.

Education
The city of Benavides is served by the Benavides Independent School District.

Climate
The climate in this area is characterized by hot, humid summers and generally mild to cool winters.  According to the Köppen Climate Classification system, Benavides has a humid subtropical climate, abbreviated "Cfa" on climate maps.

Notable people

 Oscar Carrillo

References

Further reading

 
 Vertical Files, Dolph Briscoe Center for American History, University of Texas at Austin.

External links

Cities in Texas
Cities in Duval County, Texas